Andrés Seperizza Trabattoni (born 6 November 1975) is an Argentine former rowing coxswain. He competed in the men's coxed pair event at the 1992 Summer Olympics.

References

External links
 

1975 births
Living people
Argentine male rowers
Olympic rowers of Argentina
Rowers at the 1992 Summer Olympics
Place of birth missing (living people)
Coxswains (rowing)
Rowers at the 1991 Pan American Games
Pan American Games silver medalists for Argentina
Medalists at the 1991 Pan American Games
Pan American Games medalists in rowing